Watergen Inc. (formerly Water-Gen) is an Israel-based global company that develops water-from-air solutions.

History
Watergen was founded in 2009 by entrepreneur and former military commander Arye Kohavi and a team of engineers with the goal of providing freely accessible water to troops around the world.

Following the acquisition of Watergen by billionaire Michael Mirilashvili, in 2016, the company turned its attention to addressing water scarcity and responding to the needs of people in the aftermath of natural catastrophes.

Since then, Watergen has created a series of products that are appropriate for a variety of applications, ranging from remote rural locations to commercial office complexes. and private homes. It has been used around the world by armies as well as the public and private sectors in the United States, Latin America, India, Vietnam, Uzbekistan and the African continent.

The company's headquarters are in Petah Tikva. It has a subsidiary in the United States called "Watergen USA.".

In November 2020, the company signed a deal with the Emirati Al Dahra Agricultural Company to sell water-from-air units to the region. In January 2021, the company provided generators to produce up to 6,000 liters a day to Palestinians in the Gaza Strip. In May 2022, Watergen installed water-from-air units to a medical facility in Raqqa, Syria.

Technology
Watergen's technology is an atmospheric water generator (AWG), which generates water from air at 250Wh per liter.

References

External links
 Official Website
 Official YouTube channel
 
 

Israeli companies established in 2009
Israeli inventions
Water industry